Pantelidis is a surname. Notable people with the surname include:

Andreas Pantelidis (born 1962), Greek alpine skier 
Konstantinos Pantelidis (1901–?), Greek sprinter and long jumper
Kostas Pantelidis (born 1985), Greek darts player 
Pantelis Pantelidis (1983–2016), Greek singer, songwriter and lyricist
Savvas Pantelidis (born 1965), Greek footballer
Steve Pantelidis (born 1983), Australian footballer